The 1995 Commonwealth of Independent States Cup was the third edition of the competition between the champions of former republics of Soviet Union. It was won third time in a row by Spartak Moscow who defeated Georgian side Dinamo Tbilisi in the final. This was the first time Ukraine was represented at the tournament, as well as the first time when three points were awarded for a win.

Participants

1 Shakhtar Donetsk replaced Dynamo Kyiv (1993–94 Ukrainian champions), who refused to participate citing unwillingness to play at the traumatic artificial pitch.
2 Neftchi Baku replaced Turan Tovuz (1993–94 Azerbaijan champions).
3 Nuravshon Bukhara replaced Neftchi Fergana (1994 Uzbekistan champions).

Group stage

Group A

Results

Group B

Results

Group C
Unofficial table

Official table

Results

Group D

Results

Final rounds

Semi-finals

Final

Top scorers

External links
 1995 Commonwealth of Independent States Cup at RSSSF

1995
1995 in Russian football
1994–95 in Ukrainian football
1994–95 in European football
January 1995 sports events in Russia
February 1995 sports events in Russia
1995 in Moscow